Baldwyn Torto is a Ghanaian scientist. He is a Chemical ecologist, and a Principal Scientist at the International Centre of Insect Physiology and Ecology (ICIPE). He also doubles as an extraordinary  professor and the head of Behavioural and Chemical Ecology Unit,  Department of Zoology and Entomology at the University of Pretoria, South Africa. He is a fellow of the Entomological Society of America, a fellow of the African Academy of Sciences, and a member of the American Chemical Society.

Early life and education 
Torto was born in Accra in 1955. He obtained his bachelor of Science degree in Chemistry and Biochemistry from the University of Ghana in 1979. He was awarded his master's degree in 1982, and his doctorate degree in Organic Chemistry all from the University of Ghana. His research work was in insect chemical ecology and conducted at ICIPE from 1985 to 1988. He had his Postdoctoral research at the University of Maine, Orono, USA from 1989 to 1991.

Career 
Following his postdoctoral research at the University of Maine, Torto joined ICIPE as a Scientist in 1991. In 2000, he became a Senior Scientist, and a Rothamsted International Fellow at the Rothamsted Research in the United Kingdom. A year later, he was made a visiting scientist at the USDA/ARS-Centre for Medical, Agriculture and Veterinary Entomology in Gainesville, Florida. He worked in this capacity until 2006. A year later, returned to ICIPE as a Research Leader and Principal Scientist. He was responsible for the Behavioural and Chemical Ecology Unit (BCEU). Torto works with the University of Pretoria as an extraordinary  Professor. He serves on the board of trustees of the JRS Biodiversity Foundation as its president.
 
He became a fellow of the African Academy of Sciences in 2013, and a fellow of the Entomological Society of America in 2016.
 
Torto has delivered many plenary and keynote presentations at various conferences, some of these conferences include; International Society of Chemical Ecology, the XXV 2016 International Congress of Entomology, Orlando, Florida, 13th Arbovirus and Mosquito Workshop and NE1443 Regional Project Workshop, USA, and the General assembly of the African Academy of Sciences. He is a member of the American Chemical Society, and was once the Councillor for the International Society of Chemical Ecology.
 
He is reviewer for research grants for many organisations across the globe.

Research interest 
Torto's research interests are in the field of chemical ecology application to sustainable agriculture, veterinary, public health and the environment.
 
He is credited for 240 publications, and his works have been cited over 4,000 times.
 
He is an editorial board member of the Proceedings of the Royal Society B: Biological Sciences, Pest Management Science, Current Opinion in Insect Science, International Journal of Tropical Insect Science, Journal of Chemical Ecology, a speciality editor of the Frontiers in Tropical Diseases, and Vector Biology, and an advisory board member of the Journal of Agricultural and Food Chemistry.

Honours 
Torto was the recipient of the 2020 icipe@50 Achievement Award, the Nan-Yao Su Award for Innovation and Creativity in Entomology of the Entomological Society of America in 2019. In 2018, he was awarded Louis Malassis International Prize for Food and Agriculture for Outstanding Career in Agricultural Development by the Agropolis Foundation in France, and 2017, he was honoured by the Journal of Agricultural and Food Chemistry (AGRO-division, American Chemical Society) with the Journal Article of the Year prize. That same year, he was named by the South African Department of Science and Technology as one of the top 50 scientists in Africa.

Personal life 
Torto is married to Rita, a neurophysiologist. Together, they have three children. His hobbies include cooking, gardening and playing the guitar.

References 

 

Chemical ecologists
Living people
1955 births
University of Ghana alumni
University of Maine School of Law alumni
Academic staff of the University of Pretoria
Fellows of the African Academy of Sciences